Elodina perdita, the northern pearl white or delicate pearl white, is a butterfly in the family Pieridae. It is found in the tropical north of Queensland, Australia.

The wingspan is about 40 mm. The upperside of the wings is white with black forewing tips, while the underside is white with grey forewing tips, and a pale yellow suffusion toward the base of the forewings.

The larvae feed on Capparis sepiaria.

References

Butterflies described in 1889
perdita
Butterflies of Australia